Yves Bur (born 10 March 1951 in Strasbourg) is a former member of the National Assembly of France.   He has been elected in the 4th constituency of the Bas-Rhin department and is a member of the Union for a Popular Movement.

References

1951 births
Living people
Politicians from Strasbourg
Centre of Social Democrats politicians
Union for French Democracy politicians
Union for a Popular Movement politicians
Deputies of the 12th National Assembly of the French Fifth Republic
Deputies of the 13th National Assembly of the French Fifth Republic